Laurence Bataille (1930–1986) was a French doctor, psychoanalyst and writer. She was the only daughter of the writer Georges Bataille and the actress Sylvia Bataille. After ten years of marriage, in 1971 she divorced André Basch, by whom she had a daughter. Stepdaughter of Jacques Lacan, from 1976 to 1978 she directed the review of the Freudian School of Paris Ornicar.

Works
 L'ombilic du rêve: d'une pratique de la psychanalyse, 1987

References

1930 births
1986 deaths
French people of Romanian-Jewish descent
French psychoanalysts